Daryle Skaugstad is a former nose tackle in the National Football League. Skaugstad was drafted in the second round of the 1980 NFL Draft by the Houston Oilers and later played two seasons with the team. He would split the 1983 NFL season between the San Francisco 49ers and the Green Bay Packers.

References

Players of American football from Seattle
Houston Oilers players
San Francisco 49ers players
Green Bay Packers players
American football defensive tackles
California Golden Bears football players
1957 births
Living people